Lumley Thicks is a small village in County Durham, in England. It is situated between Chester-le-Street and Houghton-le-Spring, north of Great Lumley.

Villages in County Durham